Morgan Lewis (born February 10, 1987) is an American professional basketball player who last played for the Cape Breton Highlanders of the National Basketball League of Canada (NBL Canada). He was a two-time NBL Canada All-Star in his years with the Mississauga Power.

College career
Before playing professionally, Lewis led NCAA University of Findlay to a perfect record going 36-0 en route to win the NCAA Division 2 Championship in 2009. During that year, Lewis was awarded the National Tournament MVP, NCAA National All Tournament Team and NCAA Regional All Tournament Team.

Team OVO
Grammy Award Winning Artist, Drake annually organizes a summer basketball tournament called OVO Bounce. Lewis is one of the few players that were hand-picked by the hip-hop star to join his team and compete in this prestigious tournament in Toronto.

Professional career 
In February, 2010, Lewis signed with KR Basket of the Icelandic Úrvalsdeild for the remainder of the season. In five regular season games, Lewis averaged 15.8 points and 5.0 rebounds. In the playoffs, he upped the averages to 23.4 points and 6.4 rebounds, helping KR to the semi-finals where they lost to eventual champions Snæfell.

Lewis is the first ever player drafted in the inaugural 2011 NBL Canada draft by the Oshawa Power  - now relocated to Mississauga.

Lewis was named NBLC Player of the Week on Feb 2, 2014 for the second time in his professional career in Canada. Previously, Lewis won this award with London Lightning on November 18, 2012

At the conclusion of the 2013–2014 season, Lewis was nominated for the second time of his career to become a NBLC All-Star along with Mississauga Power teammate, Alex Johnson.

References

External links
Morgan Lewis at realgm.com
Morgan Lewis at kki.is

1987 births
Living people
American expatriate basketball people in Canada
American expatriate basketball people in Germany
American expatriate basketball people in Iceland
American expatriate basketball people in Saudi Arabia
American men's basketball players
Basketball players from Ohio
Findlay Oilers men's basketball players
Island Storm players
London Lightning players
Mississauga Power players
Oshawa Power players
People from Painesville, Ohio
Shooting guards
Small forwards
Úrvalsdeild karla (basketball) players